Afrikanych is a 1970 Soviet comedy film directed by Mikhail Yershov.

Plot 
The film tells about a man who lived all his life in the village with his wife Katerina, who gave birth to six children and became ill. He sets off to look for work, but along the way he began to realize that he could not live without his family.

Cast 
 Oleg Belov
 Irina Bunina as Katerina
 Larisa Burkova
 German Orlov as Mitka
 Nikolay Trofimov as Ivan Afrikanych

References

External links 
 

1970 films
1970s Russian-language films
Soviet comedy films
1970 comedy films